The Desulfurellaceae are a small family of Campylobacterota, given their own order.

References

Campylobacterota